Brennan Hesser (born 1980) is an American television actress, best known for co-starring in Tori Spelling's VH1 sitcom, So NoTORIous. She also starred in Fox's drama,  Jonny Zero. She also guest starred in an episode of the CBS television show, The Guardian. As a child, she attended the Interlochen Arts Camp in Northern Michigan.

External links

1980 births
Living people
American television actresses
21st-century American actresses